Konstantin Ritter (born 22 April 1964) is a Liechtensteiner cross-country skier. He competed at the 1984 Winter Olympics and the 1988 Winter Olympics.

References

1964 births
Living people
Liechtenstein male cross-country skiers
Olympic cross-country skiers of Liechtenstein
Cross-country skiers at the 1984 Winter Olympics
Cross-country skiers at the 1988 Winter Olympics